John Craig (died 1620) was a Scottish physician and astronomer. He was physician to King James. He corresponded with Tycho Brahe, and associated with John Napier.

Physician
He was born in Scotland, the son of an Edinburgh tailor and merchant Robert Craig and Katherine Bellenden. The lawyer and poet Thomas Craig was his older brother. He graduated M.D. at the University of Basel. He came back in Scotland, after a decade and a half on the continent of Europe, and may have been a physician to the king.

Craig attended Agnes Keith, Countess of Moray in her final illness in Edinburgh in 1588, with the surgeon Gilbert Primose and the apothecary Thomas Diksoun.

He accompanied King James to London on James's accession to the throne of England. On 20 June 1603 James made him first physician with an anuual salary of £100. His long-serving German doctor Martin Schöner was also appointed first physician with the same salary on 6 July.
 
In 1604, he was admitted a member of the College of Physicians of London.
 
He was incorporated M.D. at the University of Oxford on 30 August 1605; was named an elect of the College of Physicians on 11 December the same year; was consiliarius in 1609 and 1617; and died before 10 April 1620, when John Argent was chosen an elect in his place.

Astronomy and mathematics
Paul Wittich taught him astronomy at the University of Frankfurt (Oder) in 1576. Craig wrote a manuscript "Capnuraniae seu Comet, in Aethera Sublimatio" addressed to his friend Tycho Brahe. Some of their correspondence was printed by Rudolf August Nolten. Craig's work was prompted by the Great Comet of 1577. The contact with Brahe was set up by William Stewart of Houston, who visited Denmark in 1589.

According to Richard A. Jarrell:

Craig was an academic in Germany for an extended period. He was in Königsberg in 1569, and in 1570 as a medical student under Caspar Peucer. He was in Frankfurt-on-Oder in 1573, teaching mathematics and logic. He returned to Scotland in 1584.

Craig may have been the person who gave John Napier of Merchiston the hint which led to his discovery of logarithms.  Anthony à Wood wrote that 
Napier himself informed Tycho Brahe, via Craig, of his discovery, some twenty years before it was made public.

References

Citations

Sources

Attribution

1620 deaths
17th-century Scottish medical doctors
Scottish astronomers
Year of birth missing
Court of James VI and I